George Chamberlain may refer to:

People
George Chamberlain (bishop) (1576–1634), Roman Catholic bishop of Ypres
George Chamberlain (MP), member of parliament for Woodstock
George C. Chamberlain (1837–1896), Minnesota state representative
George Earle Chamberlain (1854–1928), American politician who served as governor and United States from Oregon
George Henry Chamberlain (1862–1943), American politician and lawyer from Ohio
George Philip Chamberlain (1905–1995), RAF air vice marshal
George Richard Chamberlain, American actor and singer

Other
SS George Chamberlain, a World War II US Navy Liberty ship
George D. Chamberlain High School, Tampa, Florida, US

See also
George Chamberlin (1846–1928), Norfolk businessman